The Antelope was a 56-gun great frigate of the navy of the Commonwealth of England, launched at Woolwich Dockyard in 1652. Notwithstanding the term "frigate", this was the largest of the warships ordered by the Commonwealth, and was eventually classed as a second rate.

The Antelope was fitted out in July 1652, and sailed from Woolwich in August. She was commissioned under Captain Andrew Ball, and deployed to the Danish coast to convoy merchantmen from the Sound. She sailed for home on 27 September but was wrecked off Jutland at around 3 o'clock in the morning of 30 September 1652, in bad weather. Most of her crew were saved.

Notes

References

Lavery, Brian (2003) The Ship of the Line - Volume 1: The development of the battlefleet 1650-1850. Conway Maritime Press. .
Winfield, Rif (2009) British Warships in the Age of Sail 1603-1714: Design, Construction, Careers and Fates. Seaforth Publishing. .

Ships of the line of the Royal Navy
Ships built in Woolwich
Shipwrecks in the North Sea
1650s ships
17th-century maritime incidents
Maritime incidents in 1652
Ships of the English navy